Galilee (1963−1990) was New Zealand bred Thoroughbred racehorse who became one of the most successful racehorses in Australia. Galilee was the first and is still the only horse to win the Caulfield, Melbourne and Sydney Cups in one season.

Background
Galilee was a bay gelding who was foaled in 1963 at Trelawney Stud, Cambridge, New Zealand.  Galilee was sired by Alcimedes*, from the mare Galston by Balloch*. He was purchased (and later trained) by champion trainer Bart Cummings for £3,780 in New Zealand. Galilee was owned by an Adelaide builder, Max Bailey and his wife Venice, who also raced Ziema, who ran second in the 1965 Caulfield and Melbourne Cups.

Racing career
Ridden by jockey J. J. Miller, in the 1967 Sydney Cup he carried  to victory and won the race easily by six lengths, whilst in the 1966 Melbourne Cup, carrying  he decisively defeated his stablemate Light Fingers, who had won the cup the previous year.

The champion racehorse also easily won such races as the Queen Elizabeth Stakes, the Toorak Handicap and the C.B. Fisher Plate, in which he defeated champion middle-distance horse Tobin Bronze.

Bart Cummings has often referred to Galilee as the best horse he has trained. It was not until Saintly, who won the Cox Plate-Melbourne Cup double in 1996, came along that comparisons were made.

Galilee was inducted into the Australian Racing Hall of Fame.

Retirement
After retirement Galilee spent his years at the family horse stud, Beaufields near Gawler, South Australia.
He is buried at the Gawler Racetrack in South Australia.

References

External links
 Galilee's pedigree and partial racing stats

1963 racehorse births
1990 racehorse deaths
Racehorses bred in New Zealand
Racehorses trained in Australia
Australian Racing Hall of Fame horses
Melbourne Cup winners
Caulfield Cup winners
Sydney Cup winners
Sport in Cambridge, New Zealand
Thoroughbred family 5-b